SPZ may refer to:

  sporadic permafrost zone, see Permafrost.
  subparaventricular zone, a region of the hypothalamus critically involved in sleep/wake regulation
Silver Springs Airport, Nevada, USA - FID code SPZ
Springdale Municipal Airport, Arkansas, USA - IATA code SPZ
SPZ Group, owner of Sarm West Studios music company